Annie Harrison may refer to:

 Annie Fortescue Harrison (1850 or 1851–1944), English composer
 Annie Harrison, a fictional character in The Adventure of the Naval Treaty, a Sherlock Holmes story

See also
Ann Harrison (disambiguation)